The High Commission of Malta in the United Kingdom is the diplomatic mission of Malta in the United Kingdom. It is located in Malta House on Piccadilly, near Piccadilly Circus in London .

Gallery

See also

 Malta–United Kingdom relations

References

External links

Malta
London
Malta and the Commonwealth of Nations
Malta–United Kingdom relations
Malta
United Kingdom and the Commonwealth of Nations